Country Love Songs is the debut album by American country and alternative country singer/songwriter Robbie Fulks, released in 1996.

Reception

Writing for Allmusic, music critic Jack Leaver referred to Fulks as "cleverly twisted, deliciously irreverent, and one of the best of the new country singer/songwriters" and wrote of the album "Musically, Country Love Songs supplies plenty of hardcore, bottle-tippin', honky tonk country, with a '50s production that sounds like it's supposed to be there. Fulks writes and sings country music that bears little or no resemblance to what dominates the airwaves; rather, his material harks back to an era when humor and dark subject matter shared the same page of a writer's composition book." In a story for No Depression prior to the release of the album, Kevin Roe wrote "Country Love Songs touches all of the right traditional country bases in showcasing Fulks’ knack for memorable melodies and gleefully left-of-center lyrics."

Track listing
All song by Robbie Fulks unless otherwise noted.
 "Every Kind of Music But Country" (Tim Carroll) – 2:18
 "Rock Bottom, Pop. 1" (Fulks, Dallas Wayne) – 2:38
 "The Buck Starts Here" – 3:42
 "(I Love) Nickels and Dimes" – 3:05
 "Barely Human" – 3:45
 "I'd Be Lonesome" – 2:44
 "She Took a Lot of Pills (And Died)" – 2:41
 "We'll Burn Together" – 2:50
 "Let's Live Together" – 2:59
 "The Scrapple Song" – 2:42
 "Pete Way's Trousers" – 2:34
 "Tears Only Run One Way" – 2:49
 "Papa Was a Steel-Headed Man" – 3:27

Personnel
Robbie Fulks – vocals, guitar
Keith Baumann – lap steel guitar
Tom Brumley – pedal steel
Casey Driessen – fiddle
Lou Whitney – bass
Darren Wilcox – bass
Brett Simons – bass
Bobby Lloyd Hicks – drums
Ora Jones – vocals
Steve Rosen – fiddle, background vocals
The Skeletons – background vocals
Joe Terry – keyboards, piano
D. Clinton Thompson – guitar
Production
Greg Duffin – engineer
Steve Albini – engineer
John Golden – mastering
Markus Greiner – design
Elaine Moore – photography

References

1996 debut albums
Bloodshot Records albums
Robbie Fulks albums
albums produced by Steve Albini